Gilton Ribeiro or simply Gilton (born March 25, 1989) is a Brazilian football defender who last played for Guarani.

Club statistics

References

External links

1989 births
Living people
Brazilian footballers
Brazilian expatriate footballers
Cruzeiro Esporte Clube players
Clube Atlético Juventus players
Joinville Esporte Clube players
Cerezo Osaka players
Albirex Niigata players
Kashima Antlers players
Ventforet Kofu players
Paraná Clube players
Paysandu Sport Club players
Expatriate footballers in Japan
J1 League players
J2 League players
Cuiabá Esporte Clube players
Brusque Futebol Clube players
Association football defenders